Stewart Mead is an American actor and former airline pilot who has been performing for over 35 years in film, television, and theater.

Career

Acting
Mead's most notable roles include the South African judge in Amandala Kamandela, a Henry Street Settlement Production in New York City, an Off-Broadway performance as the British correspondent in Our Husband has Gone Mad Again on Theater Row, and Leo the Lionhearted in Rod Serling's Off Broadway play "Requiem for a Heavyweight."  Most recently, Stewart was featured as Police Inspector Elmer Sweeney in Ayn Rand’s Night of January 16th for Hofstra Entertainment, directed and produced by Bob Spiotto.  Additionally, he has performed in over sixty independent films  in addition to portraying the lead detective in Sam’s Creation for the Discovery Channel.

Producing and writing
Stewart is currently a producer at LTV in East Hampton, New York.  He has also produced and written for Peconic Bay Television, located in Riverhead, New York.

Education and other work
A Hofstra University alumnus, Stewart has also done graduate work at New York University. He studied acting at HB Studio and privately with the late Tony Manneno.  At the same time, he also studied jazz dance at Luigi’s School of Dance and with The Modern Dance Group in Manhattan. For over thirty years, Stewart was a pilot for a major American airline. Stewart resides in Southampton, New York.

References

American male actors
Living people
Year of birth missing (living people)
Hofstra University alumni